Gants, or in native orthography Gaj, is a Madang language of Papua New Guinea.

Classification
Daniels (2017), following Pawley, classifies Gants as an East Sogeram language, with Kursav as its closest relative. 
Usher concurs.

Pronouns
Gants pronouns may be compared with those of other Madang languages:

The roots ya, na, nu, a-, na-, n(i)- correspond to proto-Sogeram *ya, *na, *nu/*nɨ, *a-, *na-, *nɨ-.

References

External links
 Gants Swadesh List by The Rosetta Project at the Internet Archive

Sogeram languages
Languages of Madang Province